is a Japanese actress and voice actress from Tokyo, Japan. She is employed by the talent management firm Kiraboshi.

Biography

Filmography

Television animation
Future Boy Conan (1978) – Jimsy
Doraemon (1979) – Giant's mom; Sewashi (First); Jaiko (Second)
Fruits Basket (2001) – Mother of Minagawa Motoko

Unknown date
Adventures of Tom Sawyer (Japanese version) – Huckleberry Finn
Story of the Alps: My Annette – Jean
Anime Himitsu no Hanazono – Susan Sowerby
Akage no Ann – Charlie
Ashita e Free Kick – Tomiko Ohta
Kuma Miko: Girl Meets Bear – Tokuyama
Hanada Shōnen Shi – Tatsu Yanagihara
Magical Taruruuto-kun – Jabao's mother
Maison Ikkoku – Hanae Ichinose
Mobile Suit Gundam ZZ – Anma
My Love Story!! – Yuriko Gouda
Obatarian – Hiroe
Onegai! Samia Don – Robert
rratime: Born Dragon Note! – Kevin Aprilio (young)
Voltron – Hisu ("Nanny" in the English version)
Ozu no Mahōtsukai – Jack Pumpkinhead

Tokusatsu
Mysterious girl Nile Thutmose – Love Demon (ep. 46)
Gekisou Sentai Carranger – AA Abanba (ep. 21)

Film
Mirai Shōnen Conan the Movie (1979) – Jimsy
Urusei Yatsura: Only You (1983) – Oni Commander
Mirai Shōnen Conan Tokubetsu Hen-Kyodaiki Gigant no Fukkatsu (1984) – Jimsy
Doraemon: Nobita and the Steel Troops (1986) – Gian's Mother
Doraemon: Nobita's Adventure in Clockwork City (1997) – Gian's Mother, Panda
Doraemon: Ganbare! Gian!! (2001) – Iaiko

Video games
E.X. Troopers (xxxx) - Sophie

Dubbing
Atlantis: Milo's Return – Packard
Luca – Grandmother
Babar - Winifred (season 3, episode 4: "Witches Potion")

References

External links
Official agency profile 

1947 births
Living people
Japanese video game actresses
Japanese voice actresses
Voice actresses from Tokyo